Doug Warbrick is an Australian businessman, founder of the Rip Curl brand. and notable figure in the sport of surfing. Warbrick is credited for bringing the longest running surf event in history, the Bells Beach Surf Classic, to the professional surfing circuit. He is a founding member of the  ASP World Tour, surf aficionado  and athlete mentor.

Early life
Warbrick was born on the Sunshine Coast in Queensland Australia. Warbrick began surfing as a child in Maroochydore. Warbrick's family moved to Melbourne, Victoria and Warbrick attended Brighton Grammar School.

Career

In 1967 Warbrick opened the Bells Beach surf shop.
In 1969, Warbrick founded Rip Curl with Brian Singer. Warbrick shaped surfboards  from Singer's garage. Later, Rip Curl started producing wetsuits and moved into the famed 'Old Bakery'. Warbrick and Singer had discovered what Jack O'Neill had discovered a few years earlier: cold water surfers need wetsuits. In 1980, Rip Curl moved to its current headquarters on the Surf Coast Highway in Torquay, Victoria Australia.

Tim Baker writes:  Claw was walking down the main street of Torquay when he bumped into his old mate Singer."He said, 'Do you want to make surfboards?' and I said, 'Yes,'" Singer explains simply.

Warbrick was an original member of the ASA (now Surfing Australia) in 1963 and was a committee member and V.P of Surfing Victoria in the 1960s and 1970s.  He was also a founding member of the ASP World Tour and the Surfrider Foundation Australia. Warbrick is responsible for bringing the Bells Beach Surf Classic aka the Rip Curl Pro, held during Easter each year at Bells Beach, to the professional surfing circuit. Warbrick has mentored notable athletes such as Tom Curren, Michael Peterson and Mick Fanning

Awards
In 2010, Warbrick was inducted into the Australian Surfing Hall of Fame.

Warbrick was inducted into the Brighton Grammar Hall of Fame in 2008.

References 

Living people
1942 births
People educated at Brighton Grammar School
Australian businesspeople
Australian surfers
Surfboard shapers